Centerport may refer to:
 Centerport, New York, located in Suffolk County
 Centerport, Pennsylvania, located in Berks County